Histia is a genus of moths of the family Zygaenidae.

Selected species 
Histia flabellicornis Fabricius, 1775
Histia libelluloides Herrich-Schäffer, 1850
Histia rhodope

References 

Chalcosiinae
Zygaenidae genera